The cycling competition at the 1924 Summer Olympics in Paris consisted of two road cycling events and four track cycling events, all for men only. The 50 km track event was held for the last time at these Games, having only been introduced in 1920.

Medal summary

Road cycling

Track cycling

Participating nations

A total of 139 cyclists from 24 nations competed at the Paris Games:

Medal table

References

 
1924 Summer Olympics events
1924
Olympics
Cycling in Paris
1924 in track cycling
1924 in road cycling